Jerry L. Crispino (April 17, 1930 – March 20, 2009) was an American politician who served in the New York City Council from the 14th district from 1975 to 1991.

He died on March 20, 2009, in Pelham Manor, New York at age 78.

References

1930 births
2009 deaths
New York City Council members
New York (state) Democrats
20th-century American politicians